The Catholic Archdiocese of Boston sex abuse scandal was part of a series of Catholic Church sexual abuse cases in the United States that revealed widespread crimes in the American Roman Catholic Church. In early 2002, The Boston Globe published results of an investigation that led to the criminal prosecutions of five Roman Catholic priests and thrust the sexual abuse of minors by Catholic clergy into the national spotlight. Another accused priest who was involved in the Spotlight scandal also pleaded guilty. The Globe's coverage encouraged other victims to come forward with allegations of abuse, resulting in numerous lawsuits and 249 criminal cases.

Subsequent investigations and allegations revealed a pattern of sexual abuse and cover-ups in a number of large dioceses across the United States. What had first appeared to be a few isolated cases of abuse became a nationwide scandal, then a global crisis, for the Roman Catholic Church.

Ultimately, it became clear that priests and lay members of religious orders in the Catholic Church had sexually abused minors on a scale such that the accusations reached into the thousands over several decades. Although the majority of cases were reported to have occurred in the United States, victims have come forward in other nations such as Ireland, Canada, Australia, New Zealand and India. A major aggravating factor was the actions of Catholic bishops to keep these crimes secret and to reassign the accused to other parishes in positions where they had continued unsupervised contact with youth, thus allowing the abusers to continue their crimes.

The investigation of the scandal by The Boston Globe was titled "Spotlight Investigation: Abuse in the Catholic Church". Its in-depth reporting was the central subject of Tom McCarthy's film Spotlight in 2015, which won two Academy Awards including Best Picture.

History

Boston Globe coverage
In 2002, criminal charges were brought against five Roman Catholic priests in the Boston, Massachusetts area (John Geoghan, John Hanlon, Paul Shanley, Robert V. Gale and Jesuit priest James Talbot) who were all convicted and sentenced to prison. The ongoing coverage of these cases by The Boston Globe brought the issue of "sexual abuse of minors by Catholic priests" into the national limelight.

Cover-ups
Grassroots public advocacy groups like Voice of the Faithful focused on Cardinal Bernard Francis Law after documents revealed his extensive role in covering up incidents of sexual misconduct of his priests. For example, Cardinal Law moved Paul Shanley and John Geoghan from parish to parish within the diocese despite repeated allegations of molestation of children under the priests' care. Later, it was discovered that Father Shanley had addressed a 1978 conference that led to formation of the North American Man/Boy Love Association (NAMBLA).

In 1984, John Brendan McCormack became Secretary for Ministerial Personnel in the Archdiocese of Boston. In this role, McCormack was Cardinal Law's point of interface for reviewing complaints against priests accused of sexual misconduct and removing some of them from active duty. He was later accused of taking too little action in handling Geoghan, a Boston priest who allegedly molested over 130 children during his ministry.

In 1990, after receiving complaints from an alleged victim, he removed one priest from duty and sent him to treatment, only for the same priest to later serve as a hospital chaplain. He also wrote conciliatory letters to another priest accused of pedophilia and who once defended NAMBLA, then failed to notify the diocese to which that priest was later transferred of the accusations made against him.

Cardinal Law's response
Cardinal Law's term as Archbishop of Boston began in popularity but quickly declined into turbulence towards the end of his tenure. Allegations and reports of sexual misconduct by priests of the Archdiocese of Boston became widespread causing Roman Catholics in other dioceses of the United States to investigate similar situations there. Cardinal Law's actions and inactions prompted public scrutiny of all members of the United States Conference of Catholic Bishops and the steps they had taken in response to past and current allegations of sexual abuse at the hands of priests. The events in the Archdiocese of Boston exploded into a national Roman Catholic Church sex abuse scandal.

Law's public statements and depositions during the abuse crisis claimed that the Cardinal and Roman Catholic Archdiocese of Boston did not initially have the expertise to understand pedophilia and ephebophilia and relied upon doctors' recommendations. In January 2002, Law stated, "I promulgated a policy to deal with sexual abuse of minors by clergy. This went into effect on January 15, 1993", and asserted that the "policy has been effective." In one 2002 deposition, Law said that his practice under the policy was to seek the advice of mental health professionals before deciding whether a priest accused of sexually abusing a child should be returned to the pulpit.

Impact on the diocese
In 2002, the Boston Archdiocese agreed to pay $10 million to victims of Geoghan, and in 2003, it paid an additional $85 million to 552 victims and parents who had filed civil lawsuits over the ignored abuse. In some cases, insurance companies balked at meeting the cost of large settlements, claiming the actions were deliberate and not covered by insurance. This caused additional financial damage to the Archdiocese, which already faced the need to consolidate and close parishes due to changing attendance and giving patterns. In June 2004, much of the land around the Archdiocese of Boston headquarters was sold to Boston College, in part to raise money for legal costs associated with the scandal.

Resignation of Cardinal Law
Cardinal Law submitted his resignation to the Vatican, and Pope John Paul II accepted his resignation on December 13, 2002. The Archdiocese closed sixty-five parishes before Cardinal Law stepped down from service. In response to the scandal, over fifty priests signed a letter declaring no confidence in Cardinal Law and asking him to resign.

In a statement and apology, Law said, "To all those who have suffered from my shortcomings and mistakes I both apologize and from them beg forgiveness." He remained cardinal, which is a separate appointment, and participated in the 2005 papal conclave.

Handling by Bishop Lennon
Bishop Richard Lennon's appointment as apostolic administrator of the Boston archdiocese, following the resignation of Cardinal Law, brought criticism from some sex-abuse victims' groups. This criticism increased after Bishop Lennon's appearance in the Frontline documentary Hand of God. The movie documents the history of a Salem, Massachusetts sex scandal and its effects on the film maker's own family. Lennon closes the Salem parish despite the fact it is not losing money for the Church. Then, when the movie's filmmaker attempts to film the administrative building where his brother reported his own sexual abuse, Lennon exits the building, shoves the camera, and declares he will not "feel bad about this" after being told why the filmmaker wants to film the building's exterior. He does not respond to the invitation to dialogue that the filmmaker's presence on the property represents, and attempts to avoid discussion of the sex scandal by refusing to talk about anything other than the Church's private property rights (i.e. trespassing). He responds to the filmmaker's claim that he doesn't care by calling the filmmaker a "sad little man." The mutual shouting at cross-purposes did not move either side towards healing.

Archbishop O'Malley
Bishop Seán Patrick O'Malley was appointed Archbishop of Boston on July 1, 2003, having already dealt with sexual abuse scandals in the dioceses of Palm Beach and Fall River.

On August 25, 2011, Cardinal O'Malley released a list of 159 names of priests who had been accused of sexually abusing a minor. The publication mentioned that 250 priests in the archdiocese had been accused but 69 names were omitted because they were either deceased, were not active ministers, had not been publicly accused, or were dismissed or left prior to canonical proceedings. An additional 22 names were omitted because the accusations could not be substantiated; nine of these priests were still in active ministry.

Significant sexual abuse cases

Joseph Birmingham
In 1987, after at least 23 years of child molesting by Father Joseph Birmingham during which time he was shuffled to various parishes, the mother of an altar boy at St. Anns wrote to Law asking if Birmingham had a history of molesting children. Cardinal Law wrote back "I contacted Father Birmingham. ... He assured me there is absolutely no factual basis to your concern regarding your son and him. From my knowledge of Father Birmingham and my relationship with him, I feel he would tell me the truth and I believe he is speaking the truth in this matter."

Paul Desilets
Paul Desilets, a retired Quebec priest, had been indicted on 27 counts of indecent assault and battery dating back to his time as a parish priest in Bellingham, Mass., between 1978 and 1984. In 2005, he was convicted and sentenced to 1 to 1.5 years in prison. He was later released in 2006 after serving 17 months.

Robert V. Gale
Robert V. Gale was sentenced to 4.5–5 years in prison in 2004 after pleading guilty to repeatedly raping a boy in Waltham during the 1980s. Gale (who had been treated in 1987 following years of abusing children) began a restricted ministry around 1992, living at St. Monica's in South Boston while studying at the University of Massachusetts.

Cardinal Law, who had the ultimate authority, signed off on letting Gale remain at St. Monica's. An adolescent reported that Gale abused him in his room/office in the rectory just a few months after Law's decision was made. Gale completed his prison sentence on March 17, 2009. At the time of his release, he had been transferred to the Massachusetts Treatment Center for the Sexually Dangerous in Bridgewater, where it was determined he could be released nine months early for good behavior.

John Geoghan

John Geoghan (1935–2003) was accused of sexual abuse involving more than 130 children. Charges were brought in Cambridge, Massachusetts alleging molestation that took place in 1991. Geoghan was laicized in 1998. In January 2002, Geoghan was found guilty of indecent assault and battery for grabbing the buttocks of a ten-year-old boy in a swimming pool at the Waltham Boys and Girls Club in 1991, and was sentenced to nine to ten years in prison.

The trial included testimony by the victim. Dr. Edward Messner,  a psychiatrist who treated Geoghan for his sexual fantasies about children from 1994 to 1996 also testified, as did Archbishop Alfred C. Hughes, who testified that he banned Geoghan from the swimming club after a complaint that he had been proselytizing and had engaged in prurient conversations.

After initially agreeing to and then withdrawing a $30 million settlement with 86 of Geoghan's victims, the Boston archdiocese settled with them for $10 million, and is still negotiating with lawyers for other victims. The most recent settlement proposed is $65 million for 542 victims. The settlements are being offered in response to evidence that the archdiocese had transferred Geoghan from parish to parish despite warnings of his behavior. Evidence also arose that the archdiocese displayed a pattern of transferring other priests to new parishes when allegations of sexual abuse were made.

Geoghan was charged in two other cases in Boston's Suffolk County. One case was dropped without prejudice when the victim decided not to testify. In the second case, two rape charges were dismissed by a judge after hotly contested arguments because the statute of limitations had expired. The Commonwealth's appeal of that ruling was active at the time of Geoghan's death, and remaining charges of indecent assault in that case were pending.

On August 23, 2003, while in protective custody at the Souza-Baranowski Correctional Center in Shirley, Massachusetts, Geoghan was strangled and stomped to death in his cell by Joseph Druce, a self-described white supremacist serving a sentence of life without possibility of parole for killing a man who allegedly made a sexual advance after picking up Druce while he was hitchhiking. An autopsy revealed the cause of death to be "ligature strangulation and blunt chest trauma." There have been questions raised about the advisability of placing these two men on the same unit, as prison officials had been warned by another inmate that Druce was planning to assault Geoghan.

John Hanlon
On April 25, 1994, Father John Hanlon of Hingham, Mass., who was not connected to the convictions stemming from the Spotlight investigation, was sentenced to life in prison after being convicted in March 1994 of raping 2 boys.

Richard J. McCormick
On April 8, 2020, officials from the Massachusetts Department of Corrections announced that retired Ipswich Catholic priest Richard J. McCormick died at the age of 79 while serving what was supposed to be an 8-10 year prison sentence at the Massachusetts Treatment Center in Bridgewater. He was convicted of sexually abusing two boys at an Ipswich summer camp in the 1980s.

Ronald Paquin
On January 1, 2003, Boston priest Ronald Paquin was sent to prison after pleading guilty to raping an altar boy and began serving a 12-15 year prison sentence. Boston attorney Jeffrey A. Newman, who represented the victim in the case against Paquin, described Paquin as a "key player" in the Archdiocese's sex abuse scandal, due to his insight on the Archdiocese's transfer of guilty priests. He was released in 2015 and was later convicted in Maine on November 29, 2018 on 11 counts of sexual abuse involving an altar boy he abused while visiting Maine in the 1980s. In May 2019, Paquin received a sixteen-year prison sentence. On April 23, 2020, the Maine Supreme Judicial Court upheld 10 of the 11 sex abuse charges which resulted in Paquin's Maine convictions, with only one charge being vacated. It was also ruled two of the 10 which were upheld also accounted for two other charges he was convicted of as well, thus making them offset, but also saw some of his serious charges upheld.

Paul Shanley

According to Leon Podles in his book Sacrilege: Sexual Abuse in the Catholic Church, "In late 1993, Shanley was sent to the Institute of Living in Hartford, Connecticut, for evaluation. The Boston archdiocese has refused to release this evaluation, but other released files show that Shanley admitted to nine sexual encounters, of which four involved boys, and that he was diagnosed as "narcissistic" and "histrionic." Shanley admitted that he was "attracted to adolescents" and on the basis of this confession, the Boston archdiocese secretly settled several lawsuits against Shanley. The archdiocese of Boston in 1993 had to admit to the diocese of San Bernardino part of the truth about Shanley, and the bishop of San Bernardino immediately dismissed him."

In February 2005, Shanley was found guilty of indecent assaults and the rape of a male minor and received a sentence of 12 to 15 years in prison. Shanley's case remains controversial to some because the allegations of abuse came only after the victim (now an adult) alleged that he recovered memories of the abuse from approximately 20 years earlier. The manner in which the accusations against Shanley arose and enormous attention in the media also have given rise to questions about the validity of the convictions.

Shanley was released from Old Colony Correctional Center on July 28, 2017, after completing the required 12 years of his sentence. However, he is also subject to supervised probation for another ten years.

On October 28, 2020, Shanley died at the age of 89.

James Talbot

Jesuit priest James Talbot, who taught and coached at Boston College High School, was among those charged. He had been removed from ministry in 1998 after allegations surfaced that he had molested a student at Cheverus High School in Portland, Maine. In 2005, Talbot pleaded guilty to rape, assault with intent to rape, and three counts of assault and battery, related to two students he sexually abused during his time at Boston College High School and was handed a 5-7 year prison sentence. He was released in 2011. On September 24, 2018, Talbot pled guilty to the sex abuse charges in Maine and immediately began serving a three-year prison sentence.

Robert A. Ward affair
In February 2002, Rev. Robert A. Ward was accused of molesting an altar boy in Boston in 1970. Records show that the archdiocese knew at least as early as 1995 that the pastor used cocaine and had been treated for drug abuse. The records also show that in 1999 Ward admitted to downloading of child pornography from the internet, a discovery made when a technician repaired Ward's computer and noticed the sexually explicit material. Ward was suspended by the Archdiocese of Boston in February 2002 and dismissed by the Vatican in 2005.

See also

 Barbara Blaine, founder of SNAP (Survivors Network for those Abused by Priests)
 Catholic Church sexual abuse cases
 Charter for the Protection of Children and Young People
 Crimen sollicitationis
 Films
 Deliver Us from Evil (film)
 Our Fathers (TV film)
 Sex Crimes and the Vatican (film)
 Spotlight (film)
 National Review Board
 Pontifical Commission for the Protection of Minors
 Pontifical secret
 Eric MacLeish
 Mitchell Garabedian

References

Notes

External links
 Archive of articles from the  Boston Globe
 Audits, Child And Youth Protection; US Conference of Catholic Bishops
 Charter For The Protection Of Children And Young People; US Conference of Catholic Bishops
 Child And Youth Protection; US Conference of Catholic Bishops 
 National Review Board,  Child And Youth Protection; US Conference of Catholic Bishops
 Safe Environment, Child And Youth Protection; US Conference of Catholic Bishops 
 Victim Assistance, Child And Youth Protection; US Conference of Catholic Bishops

Catholic Church sexual abuse scandals in the United States
Child sexual abuse in the United States
Incidents of violence against boys
Roman Catholic Archdiocese of Boston
Sexual abuse cover-ups
Violence against children
Violence against men in North America